Nebria fallaciosa farkaci is a subspecies of ground beetle in the Nebriinae subfamily that is endemic to Shanxi province of China.

References

Beetles described in 1996
Beetles of Asia
Endemic fauna of Shanxi